Karpatiosorbus bristoliensis is a species of flowering plant in the family Rosaceae. It is known commonly as the Bristol whitebeam. It is endemic to Great Britain, growing wild only in the Avon Gorge and in the Leigh Woods area of Bristol. There are around 300 individuals as of 2016, and the population is thought to be increasing.

References

Further reading
Watkins, J. Whitebeams spread their leaves in Bristol's Avon Gorge. The Telegraph 14 May 2009.

Endemic flora of England
bristoliensis
Endangered plants
Taxonomy articles created by Polbot
Plants described in 1934
Environment of Bristol
Taxobox binomials not recognized by IUCN